Confessions of a Womanizer (also known as Confessions of a Sex Addict) is a 2014 American comedy-drama film directed and written by Miguel Ali and starring Gary Busey, C. Thomas Howell, Andrew Lawrence, and Jillian Rose Reed.

Story
Richie (Andrew Lawrence) is an arrogant guy whose only priority is a new girl every week, until he finds himself in a real relationship with Megan (Jillian Rose Reed). It causes him to confess his womanizing and how it was sparked by a scar caused years ago. His new best friend, Ginger, a transgender prostitute, helps bring these wounds to the surface.

Cast
 Gary Busey as Gary
 C. Thomas Howell as Tony
 Andrew Lawrence as Ritchie
Andrew Miller and Jakob Miller as Young Ritchie
 Jillian Rose Reed as Megan
 Kelly Mantle as Ginger
 Nosheen Phoenix as Jasmine
 Andrew Caldwell as Matt
 Nikki Bella and Brie Bella as Erica and Sally
 Patricia de Leon as Patricia

Production
In September 2012, The Hollywood Reporter announced that Jillian Rose Reed would star as Richie's love interest. Filming took place at the Silver Dream Factory Studio in Laguna Hills, California, and at the Harbor House Diner in Sunset Beach, California.

Opening
Confessions of a Womanizer is opening nationwide with AMC Theatres on October 14, 2016.

Awards
Confessions of a Womanizer screened at 30 film festivals and won 10 awards. Kelly Mantle, who is genderfluid, made history when the film's producers sought both supporting actor and supporting actress consideration for their performance and The Academy granted the request.

References

External links
 
 
 

2014 comedy-drama films
American comedy-drama films
American independent films
Films shot in California
Films about trans women
2014 independent films
2010s English-language films
2010s American films